Kharbuk (Dargwa: Хъярбук) is a rural locality (a selo) in Dakhadayevsky District, Republic of Dagestan, Russia. The population was 1,528 as of 2010. There are 5 streets.

Geography 
Kharbuk is located 17 km west of Urkarakh (the district's administrative centre) by road. Kishcha and Khurshni are the nearest rural localities.

Nationalities 
Dargins live there.

References 

Rural localities in Dakhadayevsky District